Guanhua may refer to:
 Mandarin Chinese
 Mandarin (late imperial lingua franca)
 Standard Chinese
 Qiao Guanhua (1913–1983), politician and diplomat in the People's Republic of China